Leipzig Zoological Garden, or Leipzig Zoo is a zoo in Leipzig`s district Mitte, Germany. It was first opened on June 9, 1878.
By 2020 the zoo featured six different theme worlds, aiming at providing habitats appropriate for the species on display.

Leipzig zoo is internationally noted for its large building projects such as Pongoland (housing gorillas, chimpanzees, bonobos and orangutans) and Gondwanaland (world's second largest indoor rainforest hall at ). It has bred more than 2,000 lions, 250 rare Siberian tigers, and other carnivores like bears. Leipzig Zoological Garden has been called the "Zoo of the future". It is ranked as the best zoo in Germany and also the second-best in Europe (after Vienna).

Family visit 
Family friendly extras include a large number of playgrounds, picnic areas, various gastronomic offers. Apart from Godwanaland every part of the zoo is accessible with strollers and carts. There are various possibilities to get close to animals such as goats and stroke them. Children under 6 pay no admission.
If you want to make sure to be there at feeding time, there is the possibility to find out online at what time which aminals will be fed.
Parking is across the street, which is convenient, but the rates per hour reflect the fact that the zoo is situated downtown.
Dogs have no access to the zoo.

Theme worlds 

The Zoo Leipzig hosts six different theme worlds; the Founder's Garden, Gondwanaland, Asia, Pongoland, Africa and South America. Zoo director Prof. Dr. Jörg Junhold wants to combine species conservation, with spacious compounds, which are as appropriate for the species kept within as possible. Additionally the zoo offers educational tours to visitor groups and various special events.

Founder's Garden 

The Founder's Garden is located close to the entrance, partially in historical buildings. Besides the explorer's arch, which is also used for educational purposes this part of the zoo includes compounds displaying koalas, golden lion tamarins, coppery titi monkeys and bearded emperor tamarin, partially in the facilities of the former monkey house, which was replaced by Pogoland in 2001.

Gondwanaland 

In 2010 the massive greenhouse Gondwanaland opened comprising area larger than two football pitches (16.500 m2). It has its own tropical climate and hosts almost 200 exotic animal species and around 500 different plant species. There is a treetop trail, with squirrel monkeys jumping around very closely.
Visitors can also take a small open boat (for a small extra fee) to gain a different perspective.

Another very rare animal, living in Gondwanaland is the eastern quoll, medium-sized carnivorous dasyurid marsupial native to Australia

Asia 
One of the main attractions of this theme world are the Indian elephants. They have their own swimming pool, complete with a visitor gallery underneath, in case you make it there when the pool is opened to them, swimming elephants can be seen from below.
The critically endangered Chinese pangolin – almost extinct in the wild – also inhabits this part of the zoo.
Other species in this part of the zoo are: Siberian tiger, sloth bear and snow leopards.

Until they finally received an appropriate environment in 2017 the snow leopards lived in „traditional cages“ like the panther Rainer Maria Rilke wrote about in 1902.

Pongoland 

The modern ape-world with spacious outdoor facilities was opened in 2001 and allows four species of primates to live in family groups.
Besides that it hosts a research centre in cooperation with the Max Planck Institute for Evolutionary Anthropology the Wolfgang Köhler Primate Research Center is situated in Pogoland, operating in collaboration with the Leipzig Zoo. The research focuses on both behavior and cognition of the four species of great apes: chimpanzees, 
gorillas (in this case western lowland gorillas), orangutans, and bonobos. There is a special focus on the ontogeny of chimpanzee cognition. 
When it was planned and constructed the Yerkes National Primate Research Center functioned as role facility for its creation.

All monkeys, except the orangutans, participate in the European Association of Zoos and Aquaria which is part of the EAZA Ex-situ Programme.
Numerous young monkeys were born in Leipzig since Pogoland opened.

Africa 

One of the main attractions of the African area is the 25,000 m2 Kiwara Savannah, a shared habitat occupied by Grévy's zebras, Rothschild's giraffes,
Thomson's gazelles, Scimitar oryx, Nile lechwes and ostriches.
Amongst the other animals are lions, hyena and the very popular meerkats.

South America 
This area is scheduled to be redesigned to host a South American landscape with a large aquatic habitat will be opened for seals and penguins.
Guanacos, flamingos and Chacoan peccaries are amongst the inhabitants (before reconstruction).

Notes

External links 

Zoos in Germany
Buildings and structures in Leipzig
Tourist attractions in Leipzig